What's Going On (1997) is a book collection of personal essays by Nathan McCall.

References

External links
What's Going On at Random House

1997 books
Essay collections
American political books
English-language books